Neil Thomas Osborne Wilson (born 1930) is a former New Zealand runner who represented his country at the 1950 British Empire Games.

Early life and family
Wilson's parents were Lois Annabell Rona Wilson (née Knight) and Allan Baxter Wilson. He was educated at King's College, Auckland.

Athletics
Wilson gained national attention as a junior, winning the national men's under-19 880 yards title in both 1948 and 1949, and the national men's under-19 1 mile title in 1949. He also won the national men's under-19 cross-country championship in 1948.

At the 1950 British Empire Games, Wilson competed in the men's 880 yards. He ran second in his heat, recording a personal-best time of 1:53.2, and advanced to the final, where he ran a time of 1:53.7 to finish in fourth place.

In 1951, Wilson won the New Zealand national men's 880 yards championship title in a time of 1:56.1.

Personal life
Wilson married Raewyn Joy Clark in about 1955, and the couple went on to have two children. Raewyn Wilson died in 2014.

References

1930 births
Living people
Athletes from Auckland
People educated at King's College, Auckland
New Zealand male middle-distance runners
Athletes (track and field) at the 1950 British Empire Games
Commonwealth Games competitors for New Zealand